The Virgin Queen is a 1923 British silent historical film directed by J. Stuart Blackton and starring Diana Manners, Carlyle Blackwell and Walter Tennyson.

Production background
The film is a biopic of the life of the English Queen Elizabeth I and had sequences filmed in Prizmacolor.

Cast
 Diana Manners - Queen Elizabeth 
 Carlyle Blackwell - Lord Robert Dudley 
 Walter Tennyson - Viscount Hereford 
 Hubert Carrer - Sir William Cecil 
 A.B. Imeson - Borghese 
 William Luff - Bishop de Quadra 
 Lionel d'Aragon - Earl of Northumberland 
 Norma Whalley - Countess Lennox 
 Maisie Fisher - Queen Mary 
 Marian Constance Blackton - Mary Arundel 
 Violet Virginia Blackton - Lettice Knollys
 Ursula Jeans - Bit Part (uncredited)

See also
List of early color feature films

References

External links

SilentEra entry

1923 films
1920s historical films
1920s color films
British historical films
British biographical films
Films set in Tudor England
Films directed by J. Stuart Blackton
Films about Elizabeth I
Silent films in color
Films set in the 16th century
Films set in London
1920s biographical films
British silent feature films
British black-and-white films
1920s English-language films
1920s British films